This is a list of Chinese football transfers for the 2019 season winter transfer window. Super League and League One transfer window opened on 1 January 2019 and closed on 28 February 2019. It extended for three days to 3 March 2019 especially for the transfer in of Shaanxi Chang'an Athletic and transfer out of Yanbian Funde after Yanbian Funde was disqualified for the 2019 season due to owing taxes.

Super League

Beijing Renhe

In:

Out:

Beijing Sinobo Guoan

In:

Out:

Chongqing Dangdai Lifan

In:

Out:

Dalian Yifang

In:

Out:

Guangzhou Evergrande Taobao

In:

Out:

Guangzhou R&F

In:

Out:

Hebei China Fortune

In:

Out:

Henan Jianye

In:

Out:

Jiangsu Suning

In:

Out:

Shandong Luneng Taishan

In:

Out:

Shanghai Greenland Shenhua

In:

Out:

Shanghai SIPG

In:

Out:

Shenzhen F.C.

In:

Out:

Tianjin TEDA

In:

Out:

Tianjin Tianhai

In:

Out:

Wuhan Zall

In:

Out:

League One

Beijing BSU

In:

Out:

Changchun Yatai

In:

Out:

Guangdong Southern Tigers

In:

 

Out:

Guizhou Hengfeng

In:

Out:

Heilongjiang Lava Spring

In:

Out:

Inner Mongolia Zhongyou

In:

Out:

Liaoning F.C.

In:

Out:

Meizhou Hakka

In:

Out:

Nantong Zhiyun

In:

Out:

Qingdao Huanghai

In:

Out:

Shaanxi Chang'an Athletic

In:

Out:

Shanghai Shenxin

In:

Out:

Shijiazhuang Ever Bright

In:

Out:

Sichuan Longfor

In:

Out:

Xinjiang Tianshan Leopard

In:

Out:

Zhejiang Greentown

In:

Out:

Notes

References

2019
China